The Battle of Jajce took place in January 1518 during a series of wars between the Ottoman forces of Husrev Beg, Beylerbey of the Bosnia Eyalet, and the Hungarian and Croatian forces led by Croatian Ban Petar Berislavić. The battle was a part of the Croatian–Ottoman wars and Ottoman–Hungarian wars.

Prelude 
The fortress of Jajce was built by Hrvoje Vukčić between 1391 and 1404; the fortress consisted of a citadel and a fortified settlement, surrounded by wall with two towers, a gatehouse, and a bastion. The fort fell to the Ottomans in 1463 during their conquest of Kingdom of Bosnia, but was soon retaken by Hungarian king Matija Korvin's counter offensive on 26 December of the same year. Hungarians heavily fortified Jajce and adjacent castles and made the town a seat of Banate of Jajce, a cordon sanitaire whose purpose was to protect territories of Croatia and Slavonia from Ottoman akinji plundering raids. 

Jajce successfully withstood Ottoman attacks in 1464, 1491, 1493, 1501, 1502, 1514, and 1515. Instead of charging onto the fortress, the Ottomans eventually decided to starve it into surrender, by cutting of its food supply, preventing local people from growing food of their own food, capturing surrounding towns and keeping the town's surrounding under constant pressure by having a permanent military presence in the area. The town therefore remained a salient in Ottoman territory and as the Ottoman grip around it grew stronger, Croatian-Hungarian armies had to make forced breakthroughs into the city in order to reprovision it and keep its garrison functioning.

Battle 

After the Battle of Novigrad in 1515, the Ottomans attacked Jajce in vain several times, respecting the growing importance of the city. To relieve the Ottoman pressure, ban Petar Berislavić in January 1518 besieged adjacent Ottoman forts to the north and west of the city, Bočac and Jezero. Berislavić's forces consisted of 4,000 cavalry, 6,000 infantry (mostly from Croatia), and some Hungarian artillery, but they failed to capture any of the surrounding forts held by the Ottomans. They nonetheless managed to rout the Turks near Jajce and reprovision it, so the resistance continued.

Aftermath 
By October 1518 the town defenders again ran out of food, but managed to temporarily provide themselves by attacking and plundering unsuspecting Ottoman party which passed close to Jajce with supplies from Bočac. In the early 1519., Berislavić and his forces again pushed through to Jajce and brought fresh supplies, thus extending the garrison's lifeline for several months. Berislavić was killed in Ottoman ambush in May 1520 at Battle of Plješivica, but Croatian forces under new commanders continued to break through to besieged Jajce, such as under Krsto (Christoph) Frankapan who again successfully reprovisioned the town in June 1525. Under command of ban Petar Keglević (1521–1525) and captain Mihailo Turek, Jajce successfully repelled three more Ottoman assaults (in 1521, 1524, and 1525), but finally surrendered in 1527, after the battle of Mohacs.

Bibliography
Vojna enciklopedija (1970–76), 10 volumes, Vojno izdavački zavod Beograd, book 3, p. 798-799, article Jajce

References

Jajce
Jajce
1518 in military history
Jajce
Battle of Jajce